Alpha Mills Ebright (July 4, 1881 – October 16, 1947) was an American basketball and baseball coach and a player of baseball. He served as the head basketball (1907–08) and baseball coach (1906–1908) at the University of Missouri, and head baseball coach at the University of Kansas (1909).
  After his coaching career, Ebright practiced law in Wichita, Kansas.

See also
 1907–08 Missouri Tigers men's basketball team

References

External links
 

1881 births
1947 deaths
Basketball coaches from Ohio
Kansas Jayhawks baseball coaches
Missouri Tigers baseball coaches
Missouri Tigers men's basketball coaches
People from Gallia County, Ohio